Polatpınarı is a village in the District of Tufanbeyli, Adana Province, Turkey.

References

Villages in Tufanbeyli District